Sakkottai G. Anbalagan is an Indian politician and incumbent member of the Tamil Nadu Legislative Assembly from the Kumbakonam constituency. He represents the Dravida Munnetra Kazhagam party and was elected in elections of 2011 elections of 2016. and in the elections of 2021. He represents the Dravida Munnetra Kazhagam party. He won the 2021 assembly election with a margin of 21,383 votes against his opponent AIADMK candidate G.M. Srithar Vandayar.

Electoral performance

References 

Tamil Nadu MLAs 2011–2016
Dravida Munnetra Kazhagam politicians
Living people
Year of birth missing (living people)
Tamil Nadu MLAs 2016–2021
Tamil Nadu MLAs 2021–2026

Tamil Nadu politicians